Lakeville is a village in Paupack Township, Wayne County, Pennsylvania, United States. It is located along the western shores of Lake Wallenpaupack and can be accessed by Pennsylvania Route 590, about eight miles east of Hamlin, and approximately seven miles west of Hawley, both on Route 590. The city of Scranton is located about 17 miles west.

Attractions and recreation

Lake Wallenpaupack - a 13-mile long lake with 52 miles of shoreline
Cove Haven - A couple's only resort

Capri Marina - A full service and sale marina on Lake Wallenpaupack.

Postal Service
Lakeville formerly had its own post office, but is now served by the Hawley Post Office, as is the rest of Paupack Township.

References

Unincorporated communities in Wayne County, Pennsylvania
Unincorporated communities in Pennsylvania